The Money Free movement is a political movement that advocates for a resource-based economy, where all work is voluntary. The movement has political parties in New Zealand and the United Kingdom and is aligned with work of the American-based Jacque Fresco, who is the founder of The Venus Project.

The movement has fielded candidates in several elections across at least two countries, but has not won any positions.

Political activities in New Zealand
As of 2023, Money Free Party NZ is led by Richard Osmaston, who founded the party. Osmaston previously ran for mayor of Nelson in 2013 before founding the party in 2014.

Elections 
The party was unable to get enough verified members (500) to register for the 2014 general election. It stood five electorate candidates, but none were successful.

Party members stood for multiple mayoralties in the 2016 local elections, such as Richard Osmaston in Nelson, Gordon Marshall in Porirua, and Ted Howard in Kaikoura. Osmaston also stood for the Moutere / Waimea seat in Tasman District Council in the same year.

In the 2017 general election the party stood four candidates in electorates, winning 293 votes. The party's best result was from Scott Andrew in Palmerston North, who received 142 votes (0.41%, 5th of 5 candidates).

Osmaston stood for mayor of Grey District in 2019, receiving 302 votes compared to the winner's 2,709.

The party ran two candidates in the 2020 New Zealand general election: Richard Osmaston in West Coast-Tasman, and Prince Bhavik in Kaikōura. Neither was successful. During the 2022 local elections, Osmaston ran for six different mayoralties, winning none. Osmaston also stood as a candidate in the 2022 Hamilton West by-election, but was again unsuccessful.

Political activities in the United Kingdom 
Money Free Party-UK (MFP-UK) is a registered political party in the UK. It is led by Jodian Rodgers.

It was a registered party in Great Britain from September 2013 until November 2016, when it was statutorily deregistered. In March 2017 the UK Electoral Commission approved its re-registration.

In a 2017 interview, Rodgers advocated putting all resources into common ownership, automating as much labour as possible, and having no leaders.

Elections 
Nick Tapping ran in the 2015 Poole Borough Council election, coming last in the Canford Heath West ward. The Money Free Party was also a registered party for the 2015 general elections.

Jodiah Rodgers contested the Bristol West seat in the 2017 elections. Rodgers came last of five candidates with 101 votes, losing his deposit with just 0.1% of the vote.

Political activities in the United States 
An American named Steve Saylor announced on a podcast that he planned to campaign for U.S. president in 2020 as part of the Money Free Party, but never filed as a candidate in any state.

See also

 Egalitarianism
 Free Money Day
 Freedom of association
 Non-monetary economy
 Open-access
 Post-scarcity economy
 Refusal of work
 Subsistence economy
 Technological fix
 The Venus Project
 The Zeitgeist Movement
 Universal basic income
 Voluntaryism

References

Monetary reform
Political parties in New Zealand
Political parties established in 2014
2014 establishments in New Zealand
Political parties in the United Kingdom